Hoffmannseggia glauca is a dicot found in the legume family, Fabaceae.  Its common names include Indian rushpea, hog potato, and pig nut.

It is a California native which prefers alkaline desert flats, creosote bush communities, and disturbed areas. Hoffmannseggia glauca is found outside California in Western Nevada, Texas, Mexico and South America. In California H. glauca may be found in the San Joaquin Valley, Southern Coastal Ranges, and Western Transverse Ranges.

Description 

Hoffmannseggia glauca is an erect perennial herb and can measure up to 30 cm tall.  Branches are slender, growing out from the base of the plant, and have stalked glands.  The foliage is composed of compound leaves with primary and secondary leaflets.  Primary leaflets (5–20 mm) are odd-pinnate while secondary leaflets (4–6 mm) are even-pinnate.

The inflorescence measures 5–15 cm and is glandular.  Flowers are orange-red with spreading petals and are produced between the months of April and June.  The fruit that develops is 1.5–4 cm, glandular, curved, and short-stalked.  The fruit may or may not be deciduous.

The USDA indicates that Hoffmannseggia glauca is considered a noxious weed in Kansas.

Uses 
The Pima, Apache, Cocopa, and Pueblo ate the tubers or bulbs raw, boiled or roasted.

References 

USDA Plants Profile for Hoffmannseggia glauca
Jepson Flora Project - Hoffmannseggia glauca
Calflora: Hoffmannseggia glauca (Hoffmanseggia,  Indian rushpea, hog potato)

Caesalpinieae
Flora of California
Flora of Argentina
Flora of Arizona
Flora of Bolivia
Flora of Mexico
Flora of Nevada
Flora of New Mexico
Flora of Peru
Flora of the California desert regions
Flora of the Sonoran Deserts
Natural history of the Colorado Desert
Natural history of the Mojave Desert
Flora of Northwestern Mexico
Flora of Northeastern Mexico
Flora of Southwestern Mexico
Flora of Southeastern Mexico
Flora without expected TNC conservation status